Yusef Kandi (also Romanized as Yūsef Kandī and Yūsof Kandī) is a village in Keshavarz Rural District, Keshavarz District, Shahin Dezh County, West Azerbaijan Province, Iran. At the 2006 census, its population was 381, in 79 families.

References 

Populated places in Shahin Dezh County